The Katara Prize for Arabic Novel is an Arabic literary prize based in Qatar. It was established in 2014 by the Katara Cultural Village. The total prize pool is $650,000 and the main prize $200,000, making it one of the richest literary prizes in the world. One of its sponsors is UNESCO. The winning novels will be translated into five languages - including French and English.

The prize was originally split into two major categories: published and unpublished novels each of which had five winners. More recently, prizes were added for research/literary criticism and for young adult unpublished novels. For the published novels, the five winners originally received $60,000 while five winners under unpublished category were each awarded $30,000. Among the winners in each category, one was be chosen as the "drama" winner in which the winning works are guaranteed film adaptations. The drama winner in the published category received an additional $200,000.

In addition to the original award for Arabic novels, separate awards have been given for Arabic short stories and poetry.

Winners
 - winner of the drama prize

2015
Sources: 
Published
Amir Tag El Sir, 366 (Sudan)
Ibrahim Abdel-Meguid, Adagio (Egypt)
Muneera Sawar, Ongoing (Bahrain)
Nasira Al Sadoun, Escaping the Vortex (Iraq)
 Waciny Laredj, Butterfly Kingdom (Algeria)

Unpublished
Jalal Barjas (Jordan)
Abdul Jaleel Al Tuhami (Morocco)
Maisaloon Hadi (Iraq)
Zakaria Abu Maria (Morocco)
 Samih Al Ghabbas (Egypt)

2016
Salmi Nasser, Blue Tongues
Ali Al Refaei, Mero Family Genes
Mustapha El Hamdaoui, Princess Shadow
Saad Mohammed Raheem, Shadows of a Body
Nasser Iraq, Al-Azbakia

2017
Prize for Published Novel - $60,000 each

Said Khatibi, Forty Years Awaiting Isabel
Sameha Kheres, Fostoq Abeed
Shaker Noori, Khatoon Baghdad
Hoshank Osi, The Plight of the Questions and the Lust of Imagination
Mohamed Barada, Mawt Mokhtalif

Prize for Unpublished Novel - $30,000 each

Husein Al-Sakaf, False Face Statue
Taha Mohamed Taha, The Apple Tree
Abdelwahab Eisawi, Safar Amal Al-Manseyen 
Mohamed Al-Meer Ghalib, Shahd Al-Maqaber
Mona Al-Shimi, Watan Al-Jeeb Al-Khalfi

Research-Literary Criticism - $10,000 each

Dr. Al-Basheer Dayfallah
Dr. Khalid Ali Al-Yas
Dr. Abdelhamid Al-Hossami 
Dr. Mostafa Al-Nahal  
Dr. Youssef Youssef

Prize for Young Adult Unpublished Novels - $10,000 each

Ahmad Shehata, Jabal Al-Khorafat 
Ghamar Mahmoud, Babel’s Mirror 
Kauther Al-Gondi, Seren’s Notebook 
Moneera Al-Darwai, It is not a Condition to be a Superhero to Succeed
Nasr Sami, Al-Taer Al-Bashari

2018
Prize for a published novel - $60,000 each

Ibrahim Ahmed Ibrahim Ahmed, Barry Ansouda Sudan
Omar Ahmed Fadlallah, Breaths
The Revolution of Hamouda, A Paradise That Did Not Drop Its Apple
Qassim Mohammed Tawfiq, The Little Bird Bled
Najat Hussein Abdul Samad, No Water to Tell

Prize for a unpublished novel - $30.000 each

 Haya Saleh, Another Color of the Sunset
 Abdulkareem Al Obaidi, The American Beard
 Hassan baeti, Temporary Faces
 Thaera Akrabawi, Hajar
 Zakaria Abdel-gawad, Neigh Astray

2019 
Prize for a published novel - $60,000 each

 Laila Al-Atrash, Not Like Herself
 Majdi Daibes, The burden of guilt
 Habib Sayah, Haim & I
 Haji Jaber, Black Foam
 Habib Abdulrab Sarori, revelation

Prize for a unpublished novel - $30.000 each

 Warid Bader Al-salim, The Kidnapped
 Salemi Nasser, A Cup of Coffee and a Croissant 
 Abdelmomen Ahmed AbdelAal, At The Gates of El-Mahrousa
 Wafa Alloush, Haystack
 Aicha Ammor, A life in black and white

2020 
Prize for a published novel - $60,000 each

 Ibrahim Nasrullah, A Tank Under the Christmas Tree
 Mohamed Makhzangi, The reservist
 Fatin al-Murr, Dust 1918
 Cheikh Elbane, Wood Valley 
 Fathia Debech, Melanin

Prize for a unpublished novel - $30.000 each

 Ghazi Hussein Al-Ali, The Unmistakable Black Mercedes
 Najib Nasr, Half A Human
 Lazhar Zanned, The Watchman: An Eye on Place and the Other on Time
 Dr. Saied Al-Allam, The Maiden of Granada Love Between Two Cities: Granada and Chefchaouen
 Salem Mahmoud Salem, Happened in Alexandria

2021 
Prize for a published novel - $60,000 each

 Al Habib Al Salmi
 Ahmed Al Qarmlawi
 Fajr Yaqoub
 Ayman Rajab Taher
 Nader Manhal Haj Omar 

Prize for a unpublished novel - $30.000 each

 Etidal Najeeb Al Shoufi from Syria
 Ghid Al Ghareb from Iraq
 Younis Ali from Morocco
 Muhammad Abdullah Al Hadi from Egypt
 Walid bin Ahmed from Tunisia.
Prize for the studies category concerned with research and fiction criticism - $15,000 each
 Dr. Ahmed Adel Al Qadabi from Egypt
 Dr. Reda Jawadi from Tunisia
 Dr. Muhammad Al Dahi from Morocco
 Mamdouh Farraj Al Nabi from Egypt
 Dr. Yahya bin Al Walid from Morocco. 

Prize for youngsters’ category - $10,000 each

 Al Hanouf Muhammad Al Wahaimed from Saudi Arabia
 Faisal Muhammad Abdullah Al Ansari from Qatar
 Dr. Omar Sofi Mohamed from Egypt
 Magdy Younes from Egypt
 Munira Al Darawi from Tunisia

Prize for the published Qatari novel

 Shamma Shaheen Al Kuwari

References

Arabic literary awards
Qatari literary awards
Awards established in 2015
2015 establishments in Qatar
First book awards